Yoshikazu Okada (岡田 良一), born February 27, 1901, in the Aoyama area of Tokyo's Minato Ward, also known as Kōtama Okada, (岡田 光玉) was the founder of a new religious movement in Japan (Shinshūkyō) generally referred to as Mahikari.

Yoshikazu Okada was born into a wealthy family as the son of Inasaburo, a major general in the Imperial Japanese Army. Okada, who studied with Prince Chichibu (Yasuhito) and others who came from prominent Japanese families, graduated from the Japanese Army Officer Training School in 1922 and was commissioned a lieutenant in the Japanese Imperial Guard. After serving in military campaigns in China and Indochina, Okada retired from the army in 1941 due to a back injury with the rank of lieutenant colonel. 

Yoshikazu Okada established L. H. Yokoshi no Tomo in 1959, and in 1963, registered a religious organisation under the name "Sekai Mahikari Bunmei Kyodan." He assumed the name of "Kōtama" ("Sphere of Light") in accordance with a divine revelation. 

In 1974, with Okada's passing, there were court hearings held over eight years. After an amicable settlement was reached (wakai), Sakae Sekiguchi assumed the  leadership of Sekai Mahikari Bunmei Kyodan, and Keishu Okada established Sukyo Mahikari.

See also
 New religious movement
 Religions of Japan

References

Founders of new religious movements
Japanese new religions